Darin J. Sallam (born 1987) is a Jordanian film director and writer. She has five award-winning short films to her name, including Still Alive and The Dark Outside. Farha (2021) is her debut narrative feature film as director.

She graduated from the Red Sea Institute of Cinematic Arts (RSICA) with a MFA in Cinematic Arts.

Farha

Sallam's first film as director Farha tells the story of a girl caught in the raids of a Palestinian village during the Nakba. Sallam started writing the film in 2016 but faced great pushback, including warnings that the film would end her career. Farha is based on the story on a surviving Palestinian woman who fled to Syria and recounted her ordeal to Sallam's mother.
The film has been streamed on Netflix generating a condemnation by the Israeli government.

Filmography
 The Balcony (2008), short film
 Still Alive (2009), short film
 The Dark Outside (2014), short film
 The Parrot (2016), short film
 Farha (2021)

Awards and nominations
 Film Prize of the Robert Bosch Stiftung (2015) for The Parrot (short fiction film) 
 Best Youth Feature Film category at the 2022 Asia Pacific Screen Awards for Farah 
Farha is Jordan's submission in the Best International Feature Film category at the 95th Academy Awards.

References

Living people
Women film directors
Red Sea Institute of Cinematic Arts alumni
1987 births
Women screenwriters